Natasha Zinko (born in Odesa, Ukraine) is a London-based fashion and jewelry designer. She specialises in women’s wear and jewellery design with her main boutique in  London, United Kingdom.

Early life 
In her early life, Zinko studied law, but ultimately became a fashion designer.

Natasha pursued fashion design at the Central Saint Martins, where she learned the basics of jewellery design. Zinko later created her own jewellery brand and ready-to-wear clothes for women.

She stated “When I was doing my foundation at Chelsea College of Art and Design I discovered I was good with 3D sculpture, but since I don’t like working with big things, small-scale design really felt like the right thing. When I applied to  Central Saint Martin’s to study jewellery design that was my main focus“.

“Jewellery design always comes through my emotions and feelings. I believe that jewellery could have a protective power, like a charm. Designing jewellery, you are thinking 3D on a smaller scale, while making clothes gives you the opportunity to play with bigger dimensions. Clothing is always inspired by my day-to-day life and surroundings.”

Awards and achievements
 2009 - Winner of ‘Cool Diamonds’Award, London, UK
 2008 - Winner of First Jewellery Prize of Harold Hobbs Memorial Process Award 2007/8
 The Workshopfil Company of Tin Plate
 Workers Alias Wire Workers, London, UK
 Fashion Show 2008 Central St.Martins, London
 Swarovski Trend Forecast Award 2007/8, London 2007
 British Art Medal Society touring exhibition

References

External links 
 
 Russian Evolution: At Home With Jeweller Natasha Zinko Adorn London jewellery blog

Year of birth missing (living people)
Living people
Jewellery designers
Ukrainian fashion designers
21st-century Ukrainian women artists
Ukrainian emigrants to the United Kingdom
Ukrainian women fashion designers
Alumni of Central Saint Martins